Cann v Willson (1888) 39 Ch D 39, is an English tort law case, concerning negligent valuation.

Facts
A valuer instructed by a mortgagor sent his report to the mortgagee who made an advance in reliance on the valuation.

Judgment
The valuer was held liable in the tort of negligence to the mortgagee for failing to carry out the valuation with reasonable care and skill.

See also
Smith v Eric S Bush

1888 in case law
English tort case law
1888 in England
Negligence case law
Valuation (finance)
1888 in British law